Helladia ferrugata is a species of longhorn beetle in the subfamily Lamiinae found in Lebanon and Syria. It is black coloured with orange legs. Adults are on wing from April to June. It feeds on Centaurea species, from where it also develops.

References

External links
Helladia ferrugata

Lamiinae
Beetles described in 1884
Beetles of Asia